Valonis Kadrijaj (born 23 March 1992) is a German professional footballer who plays as a striker.

Club career
Born in Đakovica, SFR Yugoslavia, he moved with his family to Germany. Kadrijaj played youth football for FC Stern 1919 München and SpVgg Unterhaching. He made his senior debut for SpVgg Unterhaching during the 2010–11 season.

Personal life
He holds both Serbian and Kosovo citizenship.

References

1992 births
Living people
Sportspeople from Gjakova
Kosovo Albanians
Association football forwards
Kosovan footballers
SpVgg Unterhaching players
SC Pfullendorf players
FC Augsburg II players
SV Wacker Burghausen players
3. Liga players
Kosovan expatriate footballers
Expatriate footballers in Germany
Kosovan expatriate sportspeople in Germany